Rouvray may refer to the following communes in France:

Rouvray, Côte-d'Or, in the Côte-d'Or département
Rouvray, Eure, in the Eure département 
Rouvray, Yonne, in the Yonne département
Rouvray-Catillon, in the Seine-Maritime département 
Rouvray-Saint-Denis, in the Eure-et-Loir département
Rouvray-Sainte-Croix, in the Loiret département 
Rouvray-Saint-Florentin, in the Eure-et-Loir département